Edward Orrick McDonnell (November 13, 1891 – January 6, 1960) was an American vice admiral and Medal of Honor recipient.

Biography
He was born on 13 November 1891 in Baltimore, Maryland. He graduated from the United States Naval Academy in 1912. 
He received the Medal of Honor for actions at the United States occupation of Veracruz, 1914.

On 10 March 1919 Lieutenant Commander McDonnell flew a British-built Sopwith Camel off an overhauled gun turret on the USS Texas and thus became the first man to fly an airplane off a battleship.

Admiral McDonnell died in the 1960 bombing of National Airlines Flight 2511 in Bolivia, North Carolina.

Medal of Honor citation
Rank and organization: Ensign Organization: U.S. Navy Born:13 November 1891, Baltimore, Md. Accredited to: Maryland Date of issue: 12/04/1915

Citation:

For extraordinary heroism in battle, engagements of Vera Cruz, 21 and 22 April 1914. Posted on the roof of the Terminal Hotel and landing, Ens. McDonnell established a signal station there day and night, maintaining communication between troops and ships. At this exposed post he was continually under fire. One man was killed and 3 wounded at his side during the 2 days' fighting. He showed extraordinary heroism and striking courage and maintained his station in the highest degree of efficiency. All signals got through, largely due to his heroic devotion to duty.

See also

List of Medal of Honor recipients (Veracruz)
List of United States Naval Academy alumni (Medal of Honor)
List of unsolved murders

References

Namesake
The frigate  was named in his memory.

External links

1891 births
1960 deaths
1960 murders in the United States
Aviators killed in aviation accidents or incidents in the United States
Battle of Veracruz (1914) recipients of the Medal of Honor
Burials at Arlington National Cemetery
Male murder victims
Mass murder victims
Members of the Early Birds of Aviation
Military personnel from Baltimore
People murdered in North Carolina
United States Naval Academy alumni
United States Navy admirals
United States Navy Medal of Honor recipients
United States Navy World War II admirals
Unsolved murders in the United States
Victims of aviation accidents or incidents in 1960